This article lists the fifty most-subscribed artists on the music platform YouTube Music. Artists' subscribers are consolidated from various YouTube channels they may have, including Vevo channels, into Official Artist Channels.

Top artists
The following table lists the fifty most-subscribed channels on YouTube Music, as well as their primary language. The channels are ordered by number of subscribers; those whose displayed subscriber counts are identical are listed alphabetically.

See also
 List of most-subscribed YouTube channels
 List of most-streamed artists on Spotify
 List of most-streamed songs on Spotify

Notes

References

YouTube-related lists
Music-related lists